Abderrahmane Amalou (6 April 1938 – 19 November 2021) was a Moroccan academic and politician. He served as Minister of Justice under the second government of Abdellatif Filali from 1995 to 1997.

References

1938 births
2021 deaths
Moroccan politicians
Moroccan academics
Government ministers of Morocco
Constitutional Union (Morocco) politicians
People from Marrakesh